Jón Halldór Eðvaldsson (born 13 March 1975) is an Icelandic basketball coach and television personality. He has served as a basketball analyst for Körfuboltakvöld (English: Basketball Night) on Stöð 2 Sport.

Early life
Before turning to coaching, Jón Halldór was a basketball referee and a football player for several years, playing the goalkeeper position. In 1999, he appeared in 17 matches for Víðir in the Icelandic second-tier 1. deild karla.

Coaching career
In June 2006, Jón Halldór was hired as the head coach of Úrvalsdeild kvenna club Keflavík. He led the team to the national championship in 2008 and the Icelandic Company Cup in 2007, 2008 and 2010. In 2011 he led Keflavík to both the Icelandic Cup and the national championship. After the finals, Jón Halldór announced that he would step down as head coach. After the season he was named the Úrvalsdeild coach of the year.

In May 2013, Jón Halldór was hired as the head coach of Grindavík. In February 2014, with Grindavík in second-to-last place in the Úrvalsdeild kvenna, Jón Halldór stepped down as head coach.

On 8 May 2019, Jón Halldór was announced as new head coach to the Keflavík women's team. Keflavík opened the 2019–20 season with a 105-81 loss against reigning champions Valur in the annual Icelandic Super Cup.

References

External links

1975 births
Jon Halldor Edvaldsson
Living people
Association football goalkeepers
Jon Halldor Edvaldsson
Jon Halldor Edvaldsson
Jon Halldor Edvaldsson
Jon Halldor Edvaldsson
Jon Halldor Edvaldsson
Jon Halldor Edvaldsson
Jon Halldor Edvaldsson
Association football players not categorized by nationality